Tunku Tan Sri Dato' Seri Imran ibni Almarhum Tuanku Ja’afar al-Haj (born 21 March 1948) is a Malaysian sports administrator. He was born as the second son of Ja'afar of Negeri Sembilan, the elected monarch of Negeri Sembilan, one of the thirteen states of Malaysia. He is often known in English simply as Prince Imran.

The prince is a former President of the Commonwealth Games Federation, and was also the president of the Olympic Council of Malaysia. He is an Honorary Member of the International Olympic Committee.

Childhood 
HRH Prince Tunku Imran was born at Istana Hinggap (Hinggap Palace), Seremban, Negeri Sembilan on 21 March 1948 as the second son of the late Tuanku Ja'afar and his wife Tuanku Najihah.

His siblings in birth order are :
 Eldest sister Tunku Tan Sri Naquiah, Tunku Dara (26 December 1944)
 Elder brother Tunku Dato' Seri Utama Naquiyuddin, Tunku Laksamana (8 March 1947)
 Younger sister Tunku Puan Sri Jawahir, Tunku Putri (27 January 1952)
 Youngest sister Tunku Dato' Seri Irinah (23 November 1957)
 Youngest brother Tunku Dato' Seri Nazaruddin, Tunku Panglima Besar (26 October 1959)

Education 
 The King’s School, Canterbury, Kent, United Kingdom
 University of Nottingham, United Kingdom (LLB 1970).

Career 
Barr-at-Law (Gray's Inn 1971). 
Indonesian Representative for PERNAS 1972-1973, 
MD Haw Par (Malaysia) Sdn Bhd 1973-1976, 
CEO Antah Group of Coys 1977-2001, 
Founder Dir of SPA, 
Chair Aluminium Co of Malaysia Bhd, Minho (Malaysia) Bhd and Lafarge Malayan Cement Bhd, Group Chair Petra Group. Dir Austral Enterprises Bhd, Island & Peninsular Bhd and Hwang-DBS (Malaysia) Bhd. Business Adviser to Jones, Lang Wootton and Partners , Jimah Power Generation IPP , 7-Eleven , Pepsi , Mirinda , 7UP , Bleu , (Permanis) , UTV , Granley Developments , Biwater , Clipper Power , Vectel Networks , Schindler , Giant Hypermarkets , Lenga Palm Oil , Noble Mineral Resources , Global Gold Holdings , Sino Hua-An International , Antah Insurance , BWI Hotels etc.....
Chair Fndn for Sporting Excellence, and the Young Malaysians Society. 
Presdt Malaysia Heritage Trust, Malaysian German Chamber of Commerce & Industry, Olympic Council of Malaysia, Malaysian Cricket Assoc, and World Squash Fed 1989-1996. 
President of Commonwealth Games Federation. 
Malaysian Chef de Mission 24th Olympic Games at Seoul 1988. 
Trustee Yayasan Tunku Naquiyuddin since 1995, Tuanku Ja’afar Coll. Dir Inst of Strategy & International Studies. Mbr National Sports Council of Malaysia, Malaysian Business Council,  etc.

Weddings and family 
m. H.H. Princess Che’ Engku Mahirah binti Abdullah, née Moira Rodrigo, 18 February 1987 and divorced 1 July 2019.

m. H.H. Princess Che Engku Noor Asmara @ Nora binti Abang Marzuki 28 March 2013.

He has one son, two step-sons and two step-daughters:

 Khairil Imran (s/o H.H. Princess Che Engku Mahirah & General Robert Windley from previous marriage)
Tunku Abdul Rahman Aminullah bin Tunku Imran (s/o Che Engku Mahirah)
 Nor Marzuki bin Musa (s/o Noor Asmara from previous marriage)
 Noreen Nong binti Musa (d/o Noor Asmara from previous marriage)
Nor Nadia Abdullah Marzuki (d/o Noor Asmara from previous marriage)

Honours

He has been awarded :

Honours of Negeri Sembilan 
  :
  Paramount of the Order of Negeri Sembilan (DTNS) (19.7.1999)
  Recipient of the Royal Family Order of Yam Tuan Radin Sunnah (DKYR)
  Knight Grand Commander of the Order of Loyalty to Negeri Sembilan (SPNS), now Principal Grand Knight or Dato’ Seri Utama,(SUNS)
  Meritorious Service Medal (PJK)

Honours of Malaysia 
  :
  Member of the Order of the Defender of the Realm (AMN) (1980)
  Commander of the Order of Loyalty to the Crown of Malaysia (PSM) - Tan Sri (1992)

Trivia 
During the opening ceremony of the 2014 Commonwealth Games, alongside Queen Elizabeth II, Imran struggled to open the baton that contained her message, but did so eventually amidst great relief and good humour.

References 
 "Syarikat Pesaka Antah Sdn Bhd" Website, presentation of the Board of Directors with photo of Tunku Imran

 

Imran, Tunku Muda Serting
Living people
Royal House of Negeri Sembilan
Malaysian Muslims
Malaysian people of Malay descent
Malaysian people of Minangkabau descent
People from Negeri Sembilan
Alumni of the University of Nottingham

Commanders of the Order of Loyalty to the Crown of Malaysia
Members of the Order of the Defender of the Realm
International Olympic Committee members
Sons of monarchs